"Press Pause"  is song performed by Belgian singer Laura Tesoro. The song was released as the second single of her debut album Limits, on 08 November 2019 by Sony Music Entertainment Belgium. The song peaked at number 21 in Belgium. The song was written by Laura Tesoro, Isabelle Gbotto, Elias Näslin, Stever Vergauwen and produced by Philip Holmgren.

Track listing

Charts

Weekly charts

Year-end charts

Release history

References

2019 singles
2019 songs
Laura Tesoro songs